Dinkar Ram (born in 1947) is a leader of the Bharatiya Janata Party and a member of the Bihar Legislative Assembly. He was elected to the Assembly for the first time in Feb. 2005 and again in October 2005. He has also won the Bihar Legislative Assembly election in 2010 and 2015 from Bathnaha. He defeated Mahagathbandhan candidate of Indian National Congress & former Minister Surendra Ram by the huge margin of about 21000 votes in 2015 Bihar Assembly Election.

References

Living people
Bharatiya Janata Party politicians from Bihar
Bihar MLAs 2005–2010
Bihar MLAs 2010–2015
Bihar MLAs 2015–2020
1947 births
Bihari politicians